Edward Nicolae Luttwak (born 4 November 1942) is an American author known for his works on grand strategy, military strategy, geoeconomics, military history, and international relations. He is best known for being the author of Coup d'État: A Practical Handbook. His book Strategy: The Logic of War and Peace, also published in Chinese, Russian and ten other languages, is widely used at war colleges around the world. His books are currently published in 29 languages besides English.

Early life
Luttwak was born into a Jewish family in Arad, Romania, and raised in Sicily and in England.

Career
After attending a boarding school in Berkshire, where he joined the British Army cadet corps, Luttwak moved to London at the age of 16 and went to a grammar school (which in England is an academically selective school for students aged from 11 to 18). He then studied analytical economics at the London School of Economics. In 1968, when he was 26 and working in London as a consultant for the oil industry, he published the book Coup d'État: A Practical Handbook, a pastiche of a military manual. The book explains in detail how to overthrow the government of a state, looking in particular at coups d'état on the African continent and in the Middle East. The spy fiction author John le Carré praised the book and compared Luttwak to Machiavelli. Luttwak graduated from the London School of Economics in 1969. 

Luttwak was a war volunteer in Israel in 1967 and later worked for the Israel Defense Forces. In 1972 he moved to the United States for graduate studies at Johns Hopkins School of Advanced International Studies (SAIS). He graduated with a PhD in International Relations in 1975. The title of his dissertation was Force and Diplomacy in Roman Strategies of Imperial Security. Earlier, during a two-month visit to Washington, D.C. in 1969, Luttwak and Richard Perle, his former roommate in London, joined a thinktank, the Committee to Maintain a Prudent Defence Policy, assembled by Dean Acheson and Paul Nitze to lobby Congress for anti-ballistic missile systems.

In late 1974 and into 1975 a series of articles was published by neoconservative intellectuals discussing whether the US military should seize the oilfields in Saudi Arabia. In March 1975, Harper's Magazine published an article that Luttwak had written under the pseudonym "Miles Ignotus" with the title "Seizing Arab Oil". Luttwak had previously published the gist of his argument on how to break Arab power under the title "Obsolescent Elites", using his real name, in The Times Literary Supplement. He suggested that U.S. Marines, assisted by the 82nd Airborne Division, should storm the eastern beaches of Saudi Arabia. The article and the author attracted considerable attention, but there is no evidence that the Ford administration ever considered such an intervention. James Akins, then U.S. Ambassador to Saudi Arabia, publicly denounced the "invasion scenario" as a product of "sick minds". In 2004 Luttwak told the Wall Street Journal that he had written the article "after discussion with several like-minded consultants and officials in the Pentagon".

In 1976 Luttwak published The Grand Strategy of the Roman Empire from the First Century AD to the Third, which generated controversy among professional historians who saw Luttwak as an outsider and a non-specialist in the field. However, the book is recognized as seminal because it raised basic questions about the Roman Army and its defense of the Roman frontier. Later he started researching the Byzantine empire, beginning with its earliest surviving texts. According to Harry Sidebottom, the majority of scholars were hostile to Luttwak's enthusiasm for fighting wars on client state territory and the book made uncomfortable reading in some circles in western Europe because in the 1980s Luttwak became a security consultant to U.S. President Ronald Reagan.

In 1987 Luttwak published Strategy: The Logic of War and Peace. According to Luttwak's publisher, Harvard University Press, the book has been widely acclaimed. Luttwak became known for his innovative ideas. He suggested, for example, that attempts by major powers to quell regional wars actually make conflicts more protracted.

Luttwak went on to provide consulting services to multinational corporations and government agencies, including various branches of the U.S. government and the U.S. military.

Luttwak has served on the editorial boards of Géopolitique (France), the Journal of Strategic Studies, The European Journal of International Affairs, and the Washington Quarterly. He speaks English, French, Hebrew, Italian,and Spanish, in addition to his native Romanian. In 1997, with three partners, he purchased 19,000 hectares of land in the Bolivian Amazon, where he set up a cattle ranch.

Luttwak was a lecturer in economics at the University of Bath from 1964 to 1966. In 2004 Luttwak was awarded an honorary doctorate degree (LLD) from the University of Bath. He has also received honorary degrees from a university in Arad, Romania and another from Timisoara's University as well as the University of Bucharest. His book The Grand Strategy of the Byzantine Empire was published in late 2009.

Leon Wieseltier, who got to know Luttwak during the Reagan years, wrote: "Edward was this figure out of a Werner Herzog film. He was not some person who had read a bit of Tacitus and now worked at the Pentagon. He knew all the languages, the geographies, the cultures, the histories. He is the most bizarre humanist I have ever met."

Predictions
Before the first Persian Gulf War Luttwak incorrectly predicted that Iraqi President Saddam Hussein would evacuate Kuwait "after a week or two of bombing [the bombing continued for six weeks without inducing him to do so] and warned that the use of ground forces without heavy preliminary bombing 'could make Desert Storm a bloody, grinding combat with thousands of (US) casualties.'"  Writing a month into the bombing, Luttwak still opposed a ground campaign. He forecast that it would lead inevitably to a military occupation of Iraq from which the United States would be unable to disengage without disastrous foreign policy consequences.

In the 1999 book Turbo-Capitalism: Winners and Losers in the Global Economy Luttwak predicted that dynamic economic growth would increase ugly social phenomena such as crime rates and job insecurity, as anticipated in his London Review of Books article "Why Fascism is the Wave of the Future".

In 2009 Richard Posner analyzed intellectuals with a public profile in the U.S. Posner claimed that Luttwak sees many affinities between the United States and the declining Roman empire, leading Luttwak to predict a dark age in which the U.S. population will experience decline into third world status. According to Posner, Luttwak retained his economic pessimism when the economy of the United States stood at the turn of the century.

In 2015, Luttwak predicted that the Middle East will be embroiled in internecine war for the next thousand years, thanks to the "brilliant stroke" of strategic genius, far exceeding even Bismarck's abilities, exemplified by George W. Bush when he ignited a religious war between Sunnis and Shiites.

Luttwak predicted in a 2016 op-ed in The Wall Street Journal that the Trump administration would pursue a foreign policy "unlikely to deviate from standard conservative norms", withdrawing troops from Afghanistan and Iraq, avoiding involvement in Syria and Libya, eschewing trade wars, and modestly reducing spending — in short, "changes at the margin". In reality, Trump ordered dropping the "mother of all bombs" but left the troop withdrawal from Afghanistan for his successor to shoulder; kindled trade wars with the EU by imposing punitive tariffs, and rather than reducing military spending, Trump bloated the budget to unprecedented deficit levels.

On grand strategy

Luttwak has long insisted on the necessity of a grand strategy, but he moved beyond preoccupation with military intervention, and started to theorize diplomacy and military alliances. His Grand Strategy of the Soviet Union (1983) was the first English-language text that recognized the different nationalities that were re-emerging in the USSR and were ignored by both "Kremlinologists" and U.S. intelligence. Luttwak concluded that the Soviet Union relied entirely on military instruments for its grand strategy. Luttwak argued that Carl von Clausewitz's warning against aggressive wars was no longer relevant in the post-World War II era. He reasoned that when confronted with weapons of mass destruction, statecraft needed a grand strategy, that is, "the firm subordination of tactical priorities, material ideals, and warlike instincts to political goals". For Luttwak, grand strategy was no longer a military doctrine, but a political issue, and diplomacy was needed to achieve the security of the state. Writing in 2007 for the National Review, former George W. Bush's speechwriter David Frum said of Luttwak: "His book on the grand strategy of the Roman Empire was terrific, and his Coup d'État is that astounding thing: a great work of political science that is also a hilarious satire.

Personal life 
Luttwak describes himself as a "fanatical snorkeler" and exercises every day. He lives with his wife in Maryland. He has a son.

Works
Several of his books as listed below have also been published in foreign languages: Arabic, Chinese simplified, Chinese traditional, Czech, Danish, Dutch, Estonian, Finnish, French, German, Greek, Hebrew, Bahasa Indonesia, Italian, Japanese, Korean, Mongolian, Norwegian, Polish, Portuguese (and Brazilian Portuguese), Romanian, Russian, Spanish (in Spain, Argentina and Venezuela), Swedish, and Turkish. Hungarian and Thai translations are forthcoming.

Books
 Coup d'État: A Practical Handbook (London, Allen Lane, 1968; Revised Edition: Cambridge, MA, 1979; London, 1979; Sydney, 1979) 
 A Dictionary of Modern War (London, Allen Lane, 1971; revised edition in 1991 with Stuart L. Koehl; new edition in 1998) 
 The Strategic Balance, 1972 (New York, Library Press, 1972) 
 The Political Uses of Sea Power (Baltimore, Johns Hopkins University Press, 1974) 
 The US–USSR Nuclear Weapons Balance (Beverly Hills, Sage Publications, 1974) 
 The Israeli Army: 1948-1973 (with Daniel Horowitz) (New York, HarperCollins and London, Allen Lane, 1975) 
 The Grand Strategy of the Roman Empire from the First Century AD to the Third (Baltimore, Johns Hopkins University Press, 1976) 
 Strategic Power: Military Capabilities and Political Utility (California, 1976) 
 Sea Power in the Mediterranean: Political Utility and Military Constraints (California, 1979) 
 Strategy and Politics: Collected Essays (New Brunswick, Transaction Publishers, 1980), 
 The Grand Strategy of the Soviet Union (New York, St. Martin's Press, 1983) 
 The Pentagon and the Art of War: The Question of Military Reform (New York, Simon & Schuster, 1985) 
 Strategy and History: Collected Essays, Volume Two (New Brunswick, Transaction Publishers, 1985) 
 On the Meaning of Victory: Essays on Strategy (New York, Simon & Schuster, 1986), 
 Strategy: The Logic of War and Peace (Cambridge, Massachusetts, 1987) 
 The Endangered American Dream: How To Stop the United States from Being a Third World Country and How To Win the Geo-Economic Struggle for Industrial Supremacy (New York, Simon & Schuster, 1993) 
 Turbo-Capitalism: Winners and Losers in the Global Economy (London, Weidenfeld & Nicolson, 1998), 
 Strategy: The Logic of War and Peace, Revised and Enlarged Edition (Cambridge, Massachusetts, 2002) 
 The Middle of Nowhere: Why the Middle East Is Not Important (London, Atlantic Books, 2008) 
 The Grand Strategy of the Byzantine Empire (Cambridge, Massachusetts, 2009) 
 The Virtual American Empire: War, Faith, And Power (New Brunswick and London, Transaction Publishers, 2009) 
 The Rise of China vs. the Logic of Strategy (Cambridge, Massachusetts, 2012) 

In Japanese only:
  "China 4.0"  (Tokyo, 2016) 
  "Japan 4.0"  (Tokyo, 2018)  
  "Japan 4.0" in Mongolian only (Cyrillic) (Ulaan Baatar, 2019) 
  [Rejuvenating Japan: A National Strategy] (Tokyo: Asuka Shinsha, 2019)  [co-authored with Dr. Okuyama Masashi].

In Italian only:
  (What really is democracy) with Susanna Creperio Verratti (Milan, Arnoldo Mondadori, 1995) 
  (The ghost of poverty: a new policy to defend the wellbeing of citizens) with Carlo Pelanda and Giulio Tremonti (Milan, Arnoldo Mondadori, 1995) 
  (Where is Italy going? Interview with Edward Luttwak) with Gianni Perrelli (Newton Compton, 1997) 
  (The book of liberties. The citizen and the state: rules, rights and duties in a democracy) with Susanna Creperio Verratti (Arnoldo Mondadori, 2000) 
  (The new leaders. Winning in the 21st century) with Arduino Paniccia (Padua, Marsilio, 2000) 

As contributor:
 Vietnam: Four American Perspectives edited by Patrick J. Hearden with The Impact of Vietnam on Strategic Thinking in the United States (Purdue University Press, 1990) 
 The Tanner Lectures on Human Values, 1991 edited by Grethe B. Peterson with Strategy: A New Era? (University of Utah, 1991) 
 Feeding Mars: Logistics in Western Warfare from the Middle Ages to the Present edited by John A. Lynn with Logistics and the Aristocratic Idea of War (Boulder, Westview Press, 1994)
 Voluntary Simplicity: Responding to Consumer Culture edited by Daniel Doherty and Amitai Etzioni with Consuming For Love (Lanham, Rowman & Littlefield Publishers, 2003) 

Preface, foreword:
 The Parameters Of War: Military History from the Journal of the U.S. Army War College edited by Lloyd J. Matthews and Dale E. Brown (Washington, Pergamon-Brassey's, 1987) 
 Strategic Air Power in Desert Storm by John Andreas Olsen (London, Routledge, 2003) 
 Free Trade Doesn't Work by Ian Fletcher (U.S. Business & Industry Council, 2010; revised edition in 2011) 
 La Repubblica dei mandarini. Viaggio nell'Italia della burocrazia, delle tasse e delle leggi inutili (The Republic of mandarins. Travel in the Italy of bureaucracy, taxes and unnecessary laws) by Paolo Bracalini (Padua, Marsilio, 2014)

Selected book reviews
Luttwak has written book reviews for publications such as The American Spectator,  Commentary Magazine, London Review of Books, The New Republic, and The New York Times.

Selected articles
 
 
 
 
 "Why China Will Not Become the Next Global Power… But It Could”. Infinity Journal, Fall 2011

References

Further reading

 "The Inveterate Strategist: An Interview with Edward Luttwak" by Richard Yarrow & Max Kuhelj Bugaric, Harvard International Review, Fall 2019.
 "The Defense Intellectual: Edward N. Luttwak" by Andrew Cockburn, a profile in Grand Street, Spring 1987.

External links

 Interview about Libya from the Dean Peter Krogh Foreign Affairs Digital Archives, October 10, 1981.
 Interview about Soviet Union from the Dean Peter Krogh Foreign Affairs Digital Archives, December 15, 1983.
 , originally published in Lingua Franca (magazine), an analysis containing several pages on Luttwak's life and thought, January 23, 2001.
 Interviews Conversations with History with Harry Kreisler:
 The Role of Strategy in International Politics, March 9, 1987.
 The Logic of Strategy and U.S. Foreign Policy, November 4, 2007.
 The Grand Strategy of the Byzantine Empire, December 7, 2009.
 The Rise of China Versus the Logic of Strategy, January 2, 2013.
 
 Luttwak's articles for the London Review of Books.

1942 births
Living people
Academics of the University of Bath
Alumni of the London School of Economics
American essayists
American people of Romanian-Jewish descent
American military writers
Johns Hopkins University alumni
American military historians
People from Arad, Romania
Military strategists
Jewish American writers
American male essayists
The Washington Institute for Near East Policy
Romanian emigrants to the United States
Carnegie Council for Ethics in International Affairs
21st-century American Jews